The Artaria String Quartet (originally the Artaria Quartet of Boston) is an American string quartet based in Minnesota and now in residence at Sundin Music Hall on the campus of Hamline University. Previously the Quartet was in residence at Viterbo University and Boston College. Originally formed in Boston, the quartet was mentored by members of the legendary Budapest, La Salle, Kolisch, and Juilliard quartets. Artaria centers on string quartet performance and education. It is committed to presenting inspiring live performances, to mentoring string players of all ages, and to illuminating the world's great repertoire of chamber music to a broad audience. .

Members
Ray Shows, violin
Nancy Oliveros, violin
Annalee Wolf, viola
Patricia Ryan, cello

History of Artaria
The Artaria Quartet of Boston was formed at Boston University in 1986 by Raphael Hillyer and mentored by Eugene Lehner. Lehner was their primary teacher and actually named the ensemble. The group was also coached by the [Muir String Quartet] at BU. In 1988 Artaria was invited to teach at the quartet seminar (directed by Norman Fischer) at the Boston UniversityTanglewood Institute in the Berkshires. In 1990 they were prizewinners in the Alliance Auditions. They were also Artist Diploma students at the Longy School of Music in Cambridge, Massachusetts. In 1992, the AQB competed in the Banff International String Quartet Competition along with the St. Lawrence, Ying, Mandelring, Amati, Miami, Amernet, Harrington and Italian quartets. That same year, on the recommendation of Marcia Ferritto, they were invited to Washington DC to audition for the National Endowments newly created Rural Residency program and were hosted by the Tifton, Georgia Arts Council for the 1992-93 season. The following year they were invited to join the faculty of Boston College and Viterbo University in La Crosse, Wisconsin where they performed, coached, taught classes and at Viterbo, created a successful New Music Festival. These residency appointments ended in 1997. In 1999 and 2000 the ASQ was again invited to teach and perform at the Tanglewood Institute.

In 2001 the quartet relocated to the Twin Cities (changing its name to Artaria String Quartet) where they present an annual concert series at Sundin Music Hall and mentor young string players in the Artaria Chamber Music School. In 2004 they won a prestigious McKnight Award for Performing Artists performing music by Schubert, Shostakovich and Syler. Artaria continues to concertize across the region at public and private venues, on the radio and on public television. The quartet also directs the Stringwood Summer Music Festival in Lanesboro, Minnesota. The group has commissioned many works for string quartet by composers Marjorie Merryman, Auguste Read Thomas, Tom Oboe Lee, David Cleary, and James Syler.

Their current major project is performing and recording the complete quartets of Dmitri Shostakovich. Their Shostakovich cycle is a premiere for the Twin Cities.

Awards and recognition
Finalists 1992 Banff International String Quartet Competition
1992 National Endowment for the Arts Rural Residency Grant
2004 McKnight Award for Performing Artists
2010 Featured American Ensemble, CMA Magazine Summer 2010
2011 Chamber Music America Residency Initiative Grant

Emphasis on Chamber Music Education
The Artaria String Quartet has devoted its career to educating the next generation of chamber music performers and listeners. Their Chamber Music School ACMS features a comprehensive chamber music program of mentoring and performance with many of its young artists reaching national competitions and in 2011 being invited to perform at the Caramoor Festival on From the Top. Their summer chamber music program Stringwood founded in 2000 attracts talented high school students from across the country to study chamber music with Artaria.

Discography
The Artaria String Quartet has released five albums through their self-produced Aequbis Recordings, and one album of the String Quartets of David Cleary.

References
Chamber Music America Award recipients
emusic downloads
Baby Blue Arts, search artists for Artaria
 Artaria Audio & Video downloads at Instant Encore
 MPR spotlight on Artaria

External links
Artaria String Quartet Official website
Artaria Chamber Music School ACMS
Stringwood Chamber Music Festival Stringwood
Saint Paul String Quartet Competition SPSQC

Musical groups established in 1986
American string quartets
1986 establishments in Massachusetts